This is a list of roads in Delhi, India named after people, organized by district.

Central Delhi

East Delhi

New Delhi

North Delhi

Old Delhi

South Delhi

South West Delhi

Roads formerly named after people
The following roads were once named after people, but have since been renamed after something else.

References

Delhi
Roads in Delhi
Delhi-related lists
Lists of roads in India